Gaya may refer to:

Geography

Czech Republic
Gaya (German and Latin), Kyjov (Hodonín District), a town

Guinea
 Gaya or Gayah, a town

India
Gaya, India, a city in Bihar
Gaya Airport
Bodh Gaya, a town in Bihar near Gaya
Gaya district, Bihar

Niger
Gaya, Niger, a city in the Dosso region
Gaya Department, a department of the Dosso Region

Nigeria
Gaya, Nigeria, a city in Kano State

Malaysia
Pulau Gaya (Gaya Island), a sizeable Malaysian island near the coast of Sabah

South Korea
Gaya confederacy, an ancient league of statelets on the Korean peninsula
Geumgwan Gaya, the ruling city-state of the Gaya confederacy during the Three Kingdoms Period
Gaya Line, a railway line serving Busan
Gayasan National Park, a national park in South Gyeongsang

Spain
Gayá River

People

Forename 

 Gaya Herrington (born 1981), Dutch econometricist, sustainability researcher and activist

Surname 
Eiji Gaya (born 1969), Japanese football player
Kabiru Ibrahim Gaya (born 1952), Nigerian politician and architect
Ramón Gaya (1910–2005), Spanish artist
José Luis Gayà (born 1995), Spanish footballer
Juan Antonio Gaya Nuño (1913–1976) was a Spanish art historian, author, teacher, and art critic.

Other uses
Gaya (plant), a genus of plants in the family Malvaceae
Gaya Quartet, an Azerbaijani singing group
Gaya language, the language of the Korean Gaya confederacy
Gaya (Seediq), law of the Seediq people
Gaya melon, a honeydew melon cultivar

See also
Gaia (disambiguation)
Gaja (disambiguation)